Iddi is a surname. It may refer to:

 Abdul-Yakuni Iddi (born 1986), Ghanaian footballer
 Baba Iddi (born 1982), Ghanaian footballer
 Gilbert Seidu Iddi, Ghanaian academic and politician
 Rita Tani Iddi, Ghanaian politician
 Saani Iddi (1956–2012), Ghanaian politician and entrepreneur
 Seif Ali Iddi (born 1942), Tanzanian politician
 Ziblim Iddi, Ghanaian politician

Ghanaian surnames